Juan Manuel Marrero Monzón (born 18 October 1982), known as Juanma, is a Spanish professional footballer. On the left side, he can either operate as a defender or a midfielder.

He played 285 Segunda División games for Las Palmas, Rayo Vallecano, Huesca, Numancia and Fuenlabrada, scoring 27 times. He added 155 matches and 17 goals in the Segunda División B with Las Palmas, Oviedo and Fuenlabrada.

Club career

Las Palmas
Born in Las Palmas, Canary Islands, Juanma moved from UD Vecindario to UD Las Palmas, where he made his professional debut in the Segunda División on 6 September 2003, starting in a 2–2 home draw against CD Leganés. After two years in the Segunda División B, he scored his first goal in the second tier on 26 September 2006, a first-half penalty in a game of the same result also at the Estadio Gran Canaria.

Rayo Vallecano
Juanma signed a two-year contract with Rayo Vallecano in July 2008. Barely used in his time in the outskirts of Madrid, he was loaned a year later to SD Huesca also in the second division.

Oviedo and Numancia
On 25 August 2010, free agent Juanma joined Real Oviedo. After two seasons in division three, neither ending in a playoff place, he returned up a level at CD Numancia. Used regularly by Pablo Machín and Juan Antonio Anquela, he signed a new two-year deal with the option of a third in October 2015.

Fuenlabrada
In July 2016, having rescinded his contract when his opportunities in Soria decreased, Juanma dropped back down to Segunda B to represent CF Fuenlabrada. Having achieved promotion to the second tier via the playoffs for the first time – as champions and at the third time of asking – the 36-year-old captain renewed for one more season with the possibility of another in June 2019.

Still a regular player for Fuenla, Juanma agreed to a one-year extension in July 2021.

Honours
Fuenlabrada
Segunda División B: 2018–19

References

External links

1982 births
Living people
Spanish footballers
Footballers from Las Palmas
Association football defenders
Association football midfielders
Segunda División players
Segunda División B players
Tercera División players
Primera Federación players
UD Vecindario players
UD Las Palmas players
Rayo Vallecano players
SD Huesca footballers
Real Oviedo players
CD Numancia players
CF Fuenlabrada footballers